Ali Mili Gupchili is an Indian Marathi language TV game and talk show which aired on Zee Marathi. The show was hosted by Atul Parchure, Snehalata Vasaikar and Arnav Kalkundri. It premiered from 17 January 2020 and stopped on 21 March 2020.

Concept 
The host interacts with Celebrity guests about relationship with their childrens. Host plays different games with these childs in this show.

Guests 
 Snehalata Vasaikar
 Swapnil Joshi
 Adinath Kothare
 Samidha Guru

References

External links 
 Ali Mili Gupchili at ZEE5

Zee Marathi original programming
Marathi-language television shows
Indian reality television series
2020 Indian television series debuts
2020 Indian television series endings